Steve Kenson (born June 16, 1969) is a writer and designer of role-playing games (RPGs) and related fiction.

Career
Steve Kenson began working as an author and game designer in 1995. Kenson co-wrote the super-hero role-playing game Silver Age Sentinels, which was published by Guardians of Order in 2002. While working on Silver Age Sentinels, Kenson had pitched a setting called Freedom City for the game, but Guardians of Order turned it down.  When Chris Pramas of Green Ronin Publishing asked Kenson if he would like to design a new d20-based superhero RPG, Kenson developed Mutants & Masterminds in 2002 and his Freedom City setting was published in 2003. In 2004, Kenson became the line developer for Mutants & Masterminds, and became a more frequent contributor to Green Ronin's products. Kenson teamed up with John Snead to produce Blue Rose, a romantic fantasy role-playing game published by Green Ronin in 2005. In 2007, Green Ronin published Kenson's Paragons setting for Mutants & Masterminds.

His most notable creation is the d20 System superhero roleplaying game Mutants & Masterminds for Green Ronin Publishing, which won multiple ENnie awards. He also designed True20 Adventure Roleplaying and the Freedom City campaign setting for Green Ronin. He has written material for many RPGs, including: Aberrant, Champions, DC Universe, the Marvel Super-Heroes Adventure Game, Shadowrun, Silver Age Sentinels, and his Mutants and Masterminds.

He has written nine RPG tie-in novels: seven for the original Shadowrun series, one for Crimson Skies, and one for MechWarrior. He wrote a first trilogy of Shadowrun books produced by WizKids Games after they acquired the Shadowrun property from FASA Corporation: Born to Run, Poison Agendas, and Fallen Angels.

In 1993, Kenson helped to found Nashua Outright, a social/support group for gay, lesbian, bisexual, and questioning youth and their allies in Nashua, NH. He worked with the group as a volunteer facilitator for thirteen years.

Kenson became a full-time freelance writer for RPGs in 1995. In 2004, he became a line developer for Green Ronin Publishing, the publisher of Mutants & Masterminds and True20. He cowrote the Dungeons & Dragons manual Exemplars of Evil (2007).  In 2010 Kenson published ICONS Superpowered Role Playing, a rules-light superhero RPG.  A revised and expanded ICONS Assembled was published through Green Ronin in 2014. Icons is currently supported by Kenson's publishing mark, Ad Infinitum Adventures, and is available through DriveThruRPG.com .

Kenson lives in Merrimack, New Hampshire, with his partners, Christopher Penczak and Adam Sartwell.

Awards and honors 
Mutants and Masterminds
 2003 EN World "ENnie" Award – Best d20 Game

Mutants & Masterminds: Ultimate Power
 2007 En World "ENnie" Award – Best Art, Interior
 2007 En World "ENnie" Award – Best Rules
 2007 En World "ENnie" Award – Best d20/d20 OGL Product
 2015 GamersTable Appreciation Award

References

External links
Steve Kenson's web page
Steve Kenson RPG bibliography

1969 births
American gay writers
Living people
Role-playing game designers
Role-playing game writers